Sappi Limited, originally incorporated as South African Pulp and Paper Industries Limited in 1936, is a South African pulp and paper company with global operations.

Products and operation 

South African Pulp and Paper Industries Limited was founded in 1936. The company is now known as Sappi and is headquartered in Johannesburg, It produces and sells commodity paper products, pulp, dissolving pulp, and forest and timber products for Southern Africa and export markets. In 2013, it was the world's largest producer of dissolving pulp.

In 2003, Sappi announced that Andre Wagenaar had been appointed as the CEO of Sappi's Forest Products Division, with effect from 1 January 2004, when Dr John Job relinquished his responsibilities for the Southern African businesses.

As of 1 July 2014, Steve Binnie became Sappi's Chief Executive Officer. His predecessor, Ralph Boettger, resigned for health reasons after serving as CEO from 2007 to 2014.

In July 2019, Michael G. Haws was appointed as President and CEO of Sappi North America, succeeding Mark Gardner who retired at the end of September 2019.

Global acquisitions and closures 

In 1990 Sappi purchased the paper mills of UK Dickinson Robinson Group – Nash Mills, Keynsham Paper Mill and Fife Paper Mills from the asset-stripper Roland Franklin (Pembridge Investments). These mills were subsequently closed by Sappi as were all other acquisitions (Kymmini Oy, Blackburn Mill and Wolvercote Mill) they had made in the UK.

On 29 September 2008, Sappi purchased two paper mills in Finland, one in Switzerland and one in Germany from the M-real company. In the United States, Sappi closed its Muskegon, Michigan plant in 2009, which was founded in 1899 by the Central Paper Company. In 2011 Sappi announced closure of their Swiss production site. The company's existing kraft pulp plant in Cloquet, Minnesota was replaced by a new mill which began producing dissolving pulp in June 2013.

Price fixing controversy 

In 1996 Sappi along other 10 main producers of carbonless paper was investigated by the European Commission for illegal price fixing in various countries in the EU. Although found guilty of earning millions by fixing the price of printing paper, Sappi was granted full immunity from the fine due to its cooperation with the EC's cartel investigating unit. Other companies implicated were fined a total of $145 million.

See also 
 S. D. Warren Paper Mill: A Sappi facility in Westbrook, Maine, United States

References

External links 

 Company website
 Yahoo.com company profile
 LinkedIn company profile

Manufacturing companies based in Johannesburg
Manufacturing companies of South Africa
Manufacturing companies established in 1936
Companies listed on the Johannesburg Stock Exchange
Companies based in Johannesburg
Economy of Johannesburg
Companies formerly listed on the New York Stock Exchange
Pulp and paper companies of South Africa
Pulp and paper companies
South African brands
Multinational companies
Publicly traded companies
1936 establishments
1936 establishments in South Africa
Renewable resource companies established in 1936
Companies established in 1936
Companies of South Africa